Alexander Elliott Rogers (14 April 1867 – 19 February 1934) was a British sport shooter, who competed at the 1908 Summer Olympics and the 1924 Summer Olympics.

In the 1908 Summer Olympics, he won a bronze medal in the single-shot running deer event, placed sixth in the double-shot running deer event and 28th in the 1000 yard free rifle event.

References

External links
Alexander Rogers' profile at databaseOlympics

1867 births
1934 deaths
British male sport shooters
Olympic shooters of Great Britain
Shooters at the 1908 Summer Olympics
Shooters at the 1924 Summer Olympics
Olympic bronze medallists for Great Britain
Olympic medalists in shooting
Medalists at the 1908 Summer Olympics
20th-century British people